Esperanza is an unincorporated community in Hudspeth County, Texas, United States.

History
Esperanza was named for a farm in the area; its name means "hope" in Spanish. In 1935, a post office opened in Esperanza; Bessie Greene McCoy was the first postmaster. Esperanza's population rose from 50 in the 1930s to 100 in the mid-1940s; it remained at 100 until falling to 75 in the 1960s, where it has remained through 2000. As of the late 1980s, the community contained a school and some houses.

References

Unincorporated communities in Hudspeth County, Texas
Unincorporated communities in Texas